Waldron Spurs is a group of rocky spurs at the east side of the terminus of Shackleton Glacier in the foothills of the Queen Maud Mountains. Discovered by the United States Antarctic Service (USAS) (1939–41), and named by Advisory Committee on Antarctic Names (US-ACAN) for Lieutenant Commander James E. Waldron, U.S. Navy Reserve, pilot with Squadron VX-6 in 1957–58.

Ridges of the Ross Dependency
Dufek Coast